Patricia Alice Mahoney is an American diplomat serving as the United States Ambassador to the Central African Republic. She previously served as the United States Ambassador to Benin.

Early life and education
Mahoney earned her Bachelor of Arts degree, cum laude, from Harvard College in 1981. In 1988, she earned a Master of Arts from the University of Hawaiʻi. Mahoney attended the National War College from 2008 to 2009, becoming a Distinguished Graduate as she received her Master of Science in 2009.

Career
Mahoney's career in the United States Foreign Service has included both domestic and international assignments. From 2001 to 2004, she served as political and economic chief at the U.S. Embassy in Kathmandu, Nepal, before becoming political chief at the U.S. Embassy in Colombo, Sri Lanka, where she remained until 2006. Mahoney then served as director for South Asia for the United States National Security Council from 2006 to 2008.

Following her graduation from the National War College, she became deputy director in the Office of India, Nepal, Sri Lanka and Bangladesh Affairs in the Bureau of South and Central Asian Affairs until 2010, when she became deputy chief of mission at the American Embassy in Kathmandu, Nepal, where she served for three years. From 2013 to 2016, Mahoney was deputy chief of mission of the American Embassy in Kampala, Uganda. She then became the director of the Office of Mainland Southeast Asia from 2016 to 2018.

Ambassador to Benin
In 2018, President Donald Trump nominated Mahoney to become United States Ambassador to Benin. The Senate approved her nomination on January 2, 2019. She was sworn into office January 18, 2019. Mahoney presented her credentials in Benin on July 4, 2019.

Ambassador to Central African Republic
On July 27, 2021, President Joe Biden nominated Mahoney to be the United States Ambassador to the Central African Republic. Her nomination was sent to the Senate the following day. Hearings on her nomination were held before the Senate Foreign Relations Committee on October 20, 2021. The committee reported her favorably on November 3, 2021. On December 18, 2021, the United States Senate confirmed her nomination by voice vote. She presented her credentials to President of the Central African Republic Faustin-Archange Touadéra on April 8, 2022.

Personal
Mahoney has three adult children. She speaks French, Thai, Nepali, and Lao.

See also
List of current ambassadors of the United States

References

External links

2019

Year of birth missing (living people)
Living people
21st-century American diplomats
Ambassadors of the United States to Benin
Ambassadors of the United States to the Central African Republic
American women ambassadors
Harvard College alumni
National War College alumni
Trump administration personnel
United States Foreign Service personnel
University of Hawaiʻi at Mānoa alumni
American women diplomats